Turrubares is a canton in the San José province of Costa Rica.

History 
Turrubares was created on 30 July 1920 by decree 56.

Geography 
Turrubares has an area of  km² and a mean elevation of  metres.

The Grande de Tárcoles River delineates the north and northwest boundaries of the canton. The Carara River, Camaronal River and the Fila Negra (Black Mountains) establish the boundary on the west. The south and southwest is marked by the Tulin River, and the Galán River and Azul Creek delineate portions of the canton's border on the east.

Districts 
The canton of Turrubares is subdivided into the following districts:
 San Pablo
 San Pedro
 San Juan de Mata
 San Luis
 Carara

Demographics 

For the 2011 census, Turrubares had a population of  inhabitants, the least populated of the 82 cantons in Costa Rica.

Transportation

Road transportation 
The canton is covered by the following road routes:

References 

Cantons of San José Province
Populated places in San José Province